The Springfield News-Sun is a daily newspaper published in Springfield, Ohio, by Cox Enterprises, which also publishes the Dayton Daily News. Both newspapers contain similar editorial content, but tailor their local news coverage to the area served. The News-Sun primarily serves Springfield and Urbana, in southwestern Ohio. While the Springfield News-Sun'''s newsroom is in downtown Springfield, the newspaper is published in Dayton.

The newspaper has won nearly 100 Ohio Associated Press Awards, including a General Excellence Award. Nearly 90% of adults in Clark County read the Springfield News-Sun over the course of a month. Its website, SpringfieldNewsSun.com, is updated 7 days a week and features local breaking news.

History

Springfield's daily newspaper has been serving residents of Clark and Champaign counties since 1817. The newspaper's lineage can be traced back to the first publication in Clark County called The Farmer. Over the 1800s and 1900s the name would change several times. The Springfield Daily Democrat merged with The Press Republic in 1905 eventually becoming The Springfield Daily News; The Springfield Daily News and The Sun publications merged in 1982 to form the current name Springfield News-Sun'', making this one of the longest continuously-running newspaper publications in the region.

In late 2010, Cox Enterprises merged all of its local media holdings under the CMG Ohio brand and consolidated locations to the Cox Media Group Ohio Media Center in Dayton. In addition to its print publications, holdings include broadcast media WHIO-TV, MeTV WHIO Classic Television and radio stations WHIO (AM)-FM, K99.1FM WHKO, and WZLR The Eagle.

References

External links

 
 Official mobile website

Newspapers published in Ohio
Springfield, Ohio
Cox Newspapers